2648 Owa, provisional designation , is a background asteroid from the Flora region of the inner asteroid belt, approximately  in diameter. It was discovered on 8 November 1980, by American astronomer Edward Bowell at the Anderson Mesa Station near Flagstaff, Arizona, in the United States. The presumably S-type asteroid has a rotation period of 3.56 hours. It was named for the word "rock" in the Native American Hopi language.

Orbit and classification 

Owa is a non-family asteroid of the main belt's background population when applying the hierarchical clustering method to its proper orbital elements. Based on osculating Keplerian orbital elements, the asteroid has also been classified as a member of the Flora family, a giant asteroid family and the largest family of stony asteroids in the main-belt.

It orbits the Sun in the inner main-belt at a distance of 1.9–2.6 AU once every 3 years and 5 months (1,233 days; semi-major axis of 2.25 AU). Its orbit has an eccentricity of 0.17 and an inclination of 5° with respect to the ecliptic. The body's observation arc begins at Turku Observatory in October 1953, more than 27 years prior to its official discovery observation at Anderson Mesa.

Physical characteristics 

Owa is an assumed, stony S-type asteroid.

Rotation period 

In 2007, four rotational lightcurves of Owa were obtained from photometric observations by James W. Brinsfield at Via Capote Observatory , by astronomers at the National Undergraduate Research Observatory (NURO), as well as by Petr Pravec and Pierre Antonini. In 2012, another lightcurve was obtained by David Higgins. The consolidated result gave a rotation period of 3.5641 hours with a brightness amplitude between 0.20 and 0.35 magnitude.

Diameter and albedo 

According to the survey carried out by the NEOWISE mission of NASA's Wide-field Infrared Survey Explorer, Owa measures between 5.40 and 5.933 kilometers in diameter and its surface has an albedo between 0.38 and 0.459.

The Collaborative Asteroid Lightcurve Link assumes an albedo of 0.24 – derived from 8 Flora, the parent body of the Flora family – and calculates a diameter of 6.81 kilometers based on an absolute magnitude of 13.0.

Naming 

This minor planet was named after the Hopi word for "rock". The Hopi are a Native American tribe, who primarily live on the Hopi Reservation in northern Arizona. The asteroid's name was suggested by German-American linguist Ekkehart Malotki. The official naming citation was published by the Minor Planet Center on 1 December 1982.

Notes

References

External links 
 Asteroid Lightcurve Database (LCDB), query form (info )
 Dictionary of Minor Planet Names, Google books
 Asteroids and comets rotation curves, CdR – Observatoire de Genève, Raoul Behrend
 Discovery Circumstances: Numbered Minor Planets (1)-(5000) – Minor Planet Center
 
 

002648
Discoveries by Edward L. G. Bowell
Named minor planets
19801108